Notaeolidia schmekelae is a species of sea slug, an aeolid nudibranch, a marine gastropod mollusc in the family Notaeolidiidae.

Distribution
The original description includes seven specimens from a number of Antarctic localities at depths of 250–480 m.

References 

Notaeolidiidae
Gastropods described in 1990